Jatobá may refer to:

 Hymenaea courbaril, tree common to the Caribbean, Central, and South America
 Jatobá, Maranhão, municipality in Brazil
 Jatobá, Pernambuco, city in Brazil
 Jatobá Hydroelectric Power Plant, planned hydroelectric plant on the Tapajós river in Brazil
 Jatobá do Piauí, municipality in Brazil
 Jatobá River, river in eastern Brazil
 Jatobá (footballer, born 1963), Carlos Roberto Jatobá, Brazilian footballer
 Jatobá (footballer, born 1995), Carlos Eduardo Bacila Jatobá, Brazilian footballer